Wonderland of Rocks is one of several rocky areas:

 An area of rhyolite tuff formations in Chiricahua National Monument in Arizona
 An area of monzogranite formations in Joshua Tree National Park in California

See also
Wonderland (disambiguation)